Stef Wertheimer (born 16 July 1926) is an Israeli billionaire industrialist, investor, philanthropist and former politician. He was a Member of the Knesset, and is known for founding industrial parks in Israel and neighboring countries. The Wertheimers are Israel's richest family as of 2013.

Biography
Stef (Ze'ev) Wertheimer was born in Kippenheim, Germany to a Jewish family. His family fled to Mandatory Palestine in 1937 to escape Nazism.

He studied in the Tel-Nordau School in Tel Aviv but dropped out of school at age 16 and started working in a camera repair store. At the same time, he began studying optics with Professor Emanuel Goldberg, a researcher and inventor who contributed significantly to different aspects of imaging technology in the first half of the twentieth century.

In 1943, during World War II, Wertheimer joined the British Royal Air Force. Wertheimer served as an optical equipment technician. He was sent to Bahrain where he repaired optical equipment installed in Britain's military aircraft.

In 1945 he joined the Palmach, where he served as a technical officer in the "German Unit" – a special guerilla force trained with British cooperation to participate in combat operations against the German army, should it reach Israel. In 1947, he joined the Haganah and worked in the development and improvement of cannons. During the 1948 Arab-Israeli War, he served as a technical officer in the Yiftach Brigade.

After the war, Wertheimer started working at Rafael, only to be dismissed shortly thereafter because of his lack of formal education. Following the war, he and his wife briefly lived on kibbutz Yir'on, but left, as he did not agree with the socialist economic model adopted by the kibbutz movement.

Wertheimer is married with four children and lives in Tel Aviv. His granddaughter is the Israeli actress Maya Wertheimer. In 2018, Eitan Wertheimer purchased a house for his father, Stef, for 20 million ILS.

Business career
In 1952, Wertheimer started his own business in the backyard of his home in Nahariya, a small metal shop and tool making company called ISCAR. The company quickly became a success and attracted the interest of Discount Investments, who later became a minority investor in the company. Today, ISCAR is one of the world's largest (by sales) manufacturers of carbide industrial-cutting tools, which are used by carmakers like General Motors and Ford. ISCAR branches exist in dozens of countries worldwide and the company employs over 5,000 people.

In 1968, as part of Israeli efforts to overcome the French weapons embargo after the Six-Day War, Wertheimer founded ISCAR Blades which later became Blades Technology – one of the largest manufacturers of blades and vanes for jet engines and industrial gas turbines. Wetheimer sold his 51% stake in Blades Technology in 2014 to jet engine maker Pratt & Whitney for an undisclosed amount.

In May 2006, Berkshire Hathaway bought 80% of ISCAR Metalworking Company for $4 billion (the Wertheimers paid $1 billion in taxes to the Israeli government). In May 2013 Buffett bought the rest of Iscar for $2.05 billion. On 5 March 2021, Forbes listed Wertheimer's net worth at US$6.2 billion, ranking him 216 on the Billionaires 2020 list.

Industrial parks
Wertheimer founded seven industrial parks – in Tefen, Tel Hai, Dalton, Lavon and now Nazareth in the Galilee; in Omer in the Negev; and another in Gebze, Kocaeli, Turkey. Each is based on five principles: exports, education, coexistence, community and culture, with the goal of fostering economic growth and job creation to help create stability in the region. As Wertheimer has explained, "The idea of industrial parks in the Middle East and on the borders between Israel and its neighbors is that the parks will bring industry and provide jobs, which will keep people busy working, instead of engaging in terrorism."

Wertheimer's model park is the Tefen Industrial Park. Built in 1982, it encompasses everything from transportation to cultural and educational facilities. Wertheimer's industrial park in the mixed Muslim-Christian Arab city of Nazareth, where Jews and Arabs work side by side, opened in April 2013. Wertheimer and Nazareth Mayor Ramez Jeraisy explained that the industrial park is part of a unique model to promote the advancement of Arab-Jewish Israeli export companies. During his visit to Israel in 2009, Pope Benedict had met with both men at the site of the future park and gave his blessing to the project. Wertheimer has said, "Coexistence in the industrial park in Arab Nazareth is a good example of coexistence. When people work together, they have no time for nonsense. They're too tired at night to commit terrorist acts. They're satisfied, they engage in producing. They work together, not against each other."

Peace efforts
Wertheimer promotes the idea of a "Marshall Plan for the Middle East" – his concept for using industry to provide training, create jobs, alleviate poverty and raise the per capita income of those living in the Middle East.

In the 1990s, he drew up plans for an industrial park in Rafah, in the Gaza Strip. The Palestinian and the Israeli governments both offered support, but one week before the groundbreaking ceremony, the Second Intifada broke out and that plan was indefinitely shelved.

In 2002, he testified before the United States House of Representatives about a "new Marshall Plan" that advocates U.S. funding to revitalize the Middle East through a sustained effort to promote commerce, jobs, and a free economy in the region.

Wertheimer's vision includes building an additional 100 industrial parks that will employ Israelis and Palestinians. Wertheimer isn't confining his idea to Israel though, and has plans underway in Turkey and Jordan.

"My Marshall Plan is based on aid from Western countries for strengthening the Middle East, in order to achieve peace and tranquillity. The parks will serve as a five-year incubator for manufacturing and export companies. If aid is obtained, the parks can usher in an era in which production, exports, education, and an advanced quality of life can replace terrorism and poverty," elaborated Wertheimer on his vision.

Political career
In 1977 Wertheimer was amongst the founding members of Democratic Movement for Change, a new centrist political party. The party was highly successful, winning 15 seats in the 1977 elections, with Wertheimer taking one of the seats. When the party split up in 1978, he joined Shinui. In 1981 following an accident, he resigned from the Knesset (was replaced by Stella Levy) and returned to his business ventures. During his term in the Knesset, he was a member of the Economics Committee. He remains active in bridging gaps between the Jewish and Arab populations of Israel, particularly by boosting Arab participation in the country's high-tech sector.

Prior to 2013 elections, he took the honorary final slot on Tzipi Livni's new list, Hatnuah. He endorsed her alliance with Labor, the Zionist Union, in 2015.

Awards and recognition
In 1991, Wertheimer was awarded the Israel Prize for his special contribution to society and the State of Israel.

In 2008 he received the Buber-Rosenzweig-Medal.

He received the Oslo Business for Peace Award in 2010, which is given to leaders in the private sector who have demonstrated transformative and positive change through ethical business practices.

In 2014 he received the President's Medal (Israel)

See also
 List of Israel Prize recipients

References

External links

Stef Wertheimer's Industrial Parks

1926 births
Living people
People from Ortenaukreis
People from the Republic of Baden
Jewish emigrants from Nazi Germany to France
Jewish Israeli politicians
Democratic Movement for Change politicians
Shinui politicians
Members of the 9th Knesset (1977–1981)
Israeli billionaires
Israeli chief executives
Israeli investors
Israeli philanthropists
Jewish philanthropists
Palmach members
Israel Prize for special contribution to society and the State recipients
Recipients of the Presidential Medal of Distinction of Israel
Commanders Crosses of the Order of Merit of the Federal Republic of Germany
Recipients of the Order of Merit of Baden-Württemberg
Royal Air Force personnel of World War II
Royal Air Force airmen